Hold the Dream: Anthology is a compilation album by Elkie Brooks. It was issued on double CD in 2000 through Castle Records. All tracks were digitally remastered.

Track listing

Disc one
"No More the Fool"
"Only Women Bleed"
"Break the Chain"
"We've Got Tonight"
"Don't Want to Cry No More"
"Hold the Dream"
"Sail On"
"You Ain't Leaving"
"Keep It a Secret"
"When the Hero Walks Alone"
"Kiss Me for the Last Time"
"Love is Love"
"I Can Dream, Can't I?"
"Only Love Will Set You Free"

Disc two
"All Night Long"
"What Kind of Man Are You"
"Cry Me a River"
"Round Midnight"
"Black Coffee"
"Save Your Love for Me"
"Don't Smoke in Bed"
"Here's That Rainy Day"
"I Ain't Got Nothin' But the Blues"
"Since I Fell for You"
"Baby What You Want Me to Do"
"I'd Rather Go Blind"
"Bad Bad Whiskey"
"Me and My Gin"
"Trouble in Mind"
"Please Send Me Some Love"

2000 compilation albums
Elkie Brooks albums